CAMH may stand for:

 Centre for Addiction and Mental Health, Toronto
 Child and Adolescent Mental Health Services in the United Kingdom
 Contemporary Arts Museum Houston